The Kleitor or Cleitor river is a river of Achaea that flows into the Aroanios near the site of the ancient city of Cleitor.

References

Geography of ancient Arcadia
Rivers of Greece